Theo Oeverhaus (born 18 December 2004) is a German racing driver. He is a protégé of Jörg Müller and the youngest driver ever to compete in the Deutsche Tourenwagen Masters.

Career

Karting 
Oeverhaus started karting at the age of 12. He mainly competed in German championships including the ADAC Kart Cup and the ADAC Kart Bundeslauf. In 2019 he finished fourth in the ADAC Kart Bundeslauf.

Cup racing 
Oeverhaus made his car racing debut in 2020 by competing in the DMV BMW 318ti Cup. He finished the season as runner-up.

DTM Trophy 
In 2021 made his debut in the DTM Trophy with Walkenhorst Motorsport. He took his first race win at the Hockenheimring and finished the season in sixth.

In 2022 he competed in the DTM Trophy with Walkenhorst Motorsport once again. He took his only race win of the season in a chaotic race at the Norisring which only ten cars finished. He also scored five other podiums on his way to finish third in the championship.

ADAC GT4 Germany 
In 2022 he also competed in the ADAC GT4 Germany for CV Performance Group after being drafted in shortly before the season began to replace Leon Koslowski. He took two podiums at Circuit Zandvoort and finished the season in fifthteenth.

GT World Challenge Europe Endurance Cup 
In 2022 he took part in his first race in GT3 machinery at the 24 Hours of Spa with Walkenhorst Motorsport. Together with his teammates Jörg Breuer, Henry Walkenhorst and Don Yount he finished second in the Bronze-class and thirtyseventh overall.

Deutsche Tourenwagen Masters 
In 2022 he made his debut in the Deutsche Tourenwagen Masters with Walkenhorst Motorsport at the age of 17. He competed in the Nürburgring round as a guest driver. He finished in the top 20 in both races.

Racing record

Career summary 

† As he was a guest driver, Oeverhaus was ineligible to score points.

References

External links 

 

Living people
2004 births
German racing drivers
Racing drivers from Lower Saxony
Sportspeople from Osnabrück
Deutsche Tourenwagen Masters drivers